Nathaniel Narbonne High School (NHS) is a school located at 24300 South Western Avenue, in the Harbor City area of Los Angeles, California. Narbonne serves grades 9 through 12 and is part of the Los Angeles Unified School District. Narbonne serves the Harbor City area and the city of Lomita.

The school motto is "Domus Victorum" which means "Home of the Victors." Narbonne's colors are green and gold. The school's mascot is the Gaucho, which is often regarded as an Argentinian cowboy. The official fight song for the high school is "Onward Narbonne!" which is a variation of "On, Wisconsin!" – the official state song of Wisconsin as well as the fight song of the University of Wisconsin–Madison.

History
Narbonne dates back to 1925. The school was named for Nathaniel A. Narbonne, a sheep rancher, who owned most of the land in the Lomita and Harbor City area. The original building, from when Narbonne covered 7th through 12 grades, is in Lomita, and is now Alexander Fleming Middle School. In 1957, the new school was built on the present site at 242nd Place and Western Avenue.

1995 killing of Shazeb Andleeb
In May 1995 Shazeb Andleeb, a 17-year-old student of Pakistani descent, was killed by several other students in a hallway at Narbonne High School. The incident is referred to in the track "The Last Stand of Shazeb Andleeb" on the 1996 album The Cult of Ray by Black Francis, who attended Narbonne in the early 1980s.

Academics

Enrollment
As of the school year 2021–22, there were a total of 1,795 students attending the high school.

Hispanic or Latino - 68.1% (1,222)
Black - 19% (341)
White - 3.6% (64)
Filipino - 3.5% (62)
Asian - 2.8% (51)
Pacific Islander - 1.3% (24)
Other/Unreported - 1.7% (31)

Notable alumni

Antwan Applewhite – NFL linebacker, Carolina Panthers, class of 2003
Nnamdi Asomugha – NFL All-Pro cornerback, Philadelphia Eagles, spouse of American actress Kerry Washington
Marc Brown – television news anchor, KABC-TV Los Angeles
Bobby Brooks – professional baseball player
Larry Carlton – jazz guitarist
Rod Craig – former Major League Baseball player
Major Culbert – football player
Lynn Davis – singer, voice actress, and record producer
Jeff Dedmon – former Major League Baseball pitcher
B. B. Dickerson – bass player and vocalist with the band War
Dashon Goldson – NFL Pro Bowl free safety, Tampa Bay Buccaneers
Tom Graham – defensive linebacker for Denver Broncos
Ebony Hoffman – WNBA center Indiana Fever, class of 2000
Imani – hip-hop artist; founding member of The Pharcyde, class of 1989
Jermar Jefferson – running back for the Detroit Lions
Diana Lee Inosanto – film director, writer, producer, actress, stuntwoman, and martial artist, class of 1984
Mat Kaplan – Planetary Society host, presenter. class of 1971
Daddy Kev – music producer and engineer, class of 1992
James Lesure – television actor, class of 1988
Roy Lewis – NFL cornerback, Seattle Seahawks
Brandon Manumaleuna – NFL tight end, San Diego Chargers
John Mizuno – member of the Hawaii House of Representatives (2006–present), class of 1982
Loree Moore – WNBA Guard and Captain, New York Liberty
Denise Nakano – news anchor and reporter for NBC 10 News (WCAU, Philadelphia), class of 1992
Stephen L. Neal – United States congressman representing North Carolina 1975–1995, class of 1952 
Uchenna Nwosu – NFL outside linebacker, Seattle Seahawks 
Paul Pettit – pitcher, Pittsburgh Pirates, Major League Baseball's first $100,000 signing bonus, Class of 1950 
Joe Puerta – member of rock bands Ambrosia and Bruce Hornsby and the Range, Class of 1969 
Chad Qualls – former Major League Baseball player
Jonathan McKenzi Smith – NFL running back
Art Stephenson – director of NASA's Marshall Space Flight Center, 1998–2003 
Edward O. Thorp – author of "Beat The Dealer", the original study of card counting in blackjack, class of 1949
Lisa Willis – WNBA guard, New York Liberty
Jessica Williams – actress and comedian on The Daily Show, class of 2007

Attended but did not graduate from Narbonne

Dale Atkeson – NFL fullback, Washington Redskins, 1954–1956
Frank Black (Charles Michael Kittridge Thompson IV) – musician, Pixies lead singer
Bo Derek (Mary Cathleen Collins) – movie actress (10) and supermodel
Rick Griffin – artist and illustrator
Amir Johnson – NBA forward for the Toronto Raptors. Graduated from Westchester High School in Los Angeles and entered the 2005 NBA draft upon graduation. He was chosen 56th overall by the Detroit Pistons.
Bill Sharman – NBA 8-time All-Star and 4-time champion with the Boston Celtics. Head coach, Los Angeles Lakers 1971–76, NBA Champions 1972, including the longest winning streak in the history of the NBA and in American major professional team sports (33 games). 
Bill Stits – UCLA alumnus, NFL player
Quentin Tarantino – film director (Kill Bill, Pulp Fiction, Once Upon a Time in Hollywood), actor.
Douglas Christopher Judge – actor, played Teal'c in the television series Stargate SG-1. (Graduate of Carson High School, class of 1982.)

In media
Narbonne has been a filming location for the following movies:
Trippin' aka G's Trippin'

References

External links
 Narbonne High School (Official website)

Los Angeles Unified School District schools
High schools in Los Angeles
Public high schools in California
Los Angeles Harbor Region
Lomita, California
Educational institutions established in 1925
1925 establishments in California